Tahri may refer to
Tahri (dish), a yellow rice dish in Awadhi cuisine
Bouabdellah Tahri (born 1978), runner of Algerian descent
Jihan El-Tahri, writer, director and producer of documentary films from Lebanon